Turla or Uroboros (Russian: Турла)  is a Trojan package that is suspected by computer security researchers and Western intelligence officers to be the product of a Russian government agency of the same name.

High infection rates of the virus were observed in Russia, Kazakhstan and Vietnam, followed by US and China, and low infection rates in Europe, South America and Asia (including India).

Malware
Turla has been targeting governments and militaries since at least 2008.

In December 2014 there was evidence of it targeting operating systems running Linux.

Group
The advanced persistent threat hacking group has also been named Turla. Dan Goodin in Ars Technica described Turla as "Russian spies". Turla has since been given other names such as Snake, Krypton, and Venomous Bear.

See also 
 Agent.BTZ
 Red October (malware)

References 

Spyware
Linux malware
Hacking (computer security)
Espionage
Cyberwarfare
Hacker groups
Hacking in the 2010s
Russian advanced persistent threat groups
Cybercrime in India